Torkaman County, formerly Bandar Torkaman County, is in Golestan province, Iran. The capital of the county is the city of Bandar Torkaman. At the 2006 census, the county's population was 122,218 in 25,295 households. The following census in 2011 counted 72,803 people in 17,772 households, by which time Gomishan District had been separated from the county to form Gomishan County. At the 2016 census, the county's population was 79,978 in 21,315 households.

Administrative divisions

The population history and structural changes of Torkaman County's administrative divisions over three consecutive censuses are shown in the following table. The latest census shows two districts, four rural districts, and one city.

References

 
Counties of Golestan Province